Permission may be:

Arts, entertainment, and media
 Permission (film)
 Permission (magazine)
 La Permission, novel 
 Permission to Land, album

Ethics and law
 Permission (philosophy), ethical concept
 Intellectual property:
 Historical Permission Notice and Disclaimer 
 Permission culture
 Planning permission, British property status

Other uses
 File system permissions 
 Repair permissions
 Application permissions
 Permission marketing